The 2016 Bord na Móna Walsh Cup was the 54th staging of the Walsh Cup since its establishment in 1954. Dublin were the winners.

Format

15 teams compete: 10 county teams from Leinster, Ulster and Connacht (Kilkenny, Laois, Wexford, Galway, Offaly, Dublin, Meath, Carlow, Antrim, Westmeath) and five third-level colleges: UCD, DIT, NUI Galway, IT Carlow and DCU. Kilkenny fielded teams composed mainly of under 21 players managed by u21 manager Eddie Brennan.

The teams are drawn into four groups, one of three teams and three of four teams. Each team plays the other teams in its group once, earning 2 points for a win and 1 for a draw. The four group winners progress to the semi-finals.

Fixtures/results

Group 1

Group 2

Group 3

Group 4

Semi-finals

Final

Top scorers

Overall

Single game

References

External links
The Bord Na Mona Walsh Cup S.H. 2016

Walsh
Walsh Cup (hurling)